I Feel a Song is the thirteenth studio album recorded by American R&B group Gladys Knight & the Pips, released in November 1974 on the Buddah label.  It was their third overall album for Buddah.

The first single release, "I Feel a Song (In My Heart)", reached #1 R&B and #21 on the Billboard Hot 100.  The B-side, "Don't Burn Down the Bridge", also charted as a tag-along on the pop chart.  A second single, "Love Finds Its Own Way", also charted, peaking at #47 pop and #3 R&B.  The final single, a live medley recording of "The Way We Were"/"Try to Remember" was also a successful hit, peaking at #11 pop and #6 R&B.  The song also gave the group its highest chart peaks on the adult contemporary and UK Singles charts, #2 and #4, respectively.  The album was also their fourth of five R&B albums chart-toppers.

Track listing

Charts

Singles

See also
List of number-one R&B albums of 1974 (U.S.)

References

External links
I Feel a Song at Discogs

Gladys Knight & the Pips albums
1974 albums
Albums produced by Burt Bacharach
Buddah Records albums